A sled, skid, sledge, or sleigh is a land vehicle that slides across a surface, usually of ice or snow. It is built with either a smooth underside or a separate body supported by two or more smooth, relatively narrow, longitudinal runners similar in principle to skis. This reduces the amount of friction, which helps to carry heavy loads.

Some designs are used to transport passengers or cargo across relatively level ground. Others are designed to go downhill for recreation, particularly by children, or competition. (Compare cross-country skiing with its downhill cousin.) Shades of meaning differentiating the three terms often reflect regional variations depending on historical uses and prevailing climate.

In British English, sledge is the general term, and more common than sled.  Toboggan is sometimes used synonymously with sledge but more often to refer to a particular type of sledge without runners.  Sleigh refers to a moderate to large-sized, usually open-topped vehicle to carry passengers or goods, and typically drawn by horses, dogs, or reindeer.
 
In American usage sled remains the general term but often implies a smaller device, often for recreational use. Sledge implies a heavier sled used for moving freight or massive objects.  Sleigh refers more specifically than in Britain to a vehicle which is essentially a cold-season alternative to a carriage or wagon and has seating for passengers; what can be called a dog-sleigh in Britain is known only as a dog-sled in North America.

In Australia, where there is limited snow, sleigh and sledge are given equal preference in local parlance.

Etymology
The word sled comes from Middle English , which itself has the origins in Middle Dutch word slēde, meaning 'sliding' or 'slider'. The same word shares common ancestry with both sleigh and sledge. The word sleigh, on the other hand, is an anglicized form of the modern Dutch word  and was introduced to the English language by Dutch immigrants to North America.

Operation

Sleds are especially useful in winter but can also be drawn over wet fields, muddy roads, and even hard ground if one helps them along by greasing the blades ("grease the skids") with oil or alternatively wetting them with water. For an explanation of why sleds and other objects glide with various degrees of friction ranging from very little to fairly little friction on ice, icy snow, wet snow, and dry snow, see the relevant sections in the articles on ice and ice skating. The traditional explanation of the pressure of sleds on the snow or ice producing a thin film of water and this enabling sleds to move on ice with little friction is insufficient. 

Various types of sleds are pulled by animals such as reindeer, horses, mules, oxen, or dogs.

History

The people of Ancient Egypt are thought to have used sledges (aka "skids") extensively in the construction of their public works, in particular for the transportation of heavy obelisks over sand.

Sleds and sledges were found in the Oseberg "Viking" ship excavation.  The sledge was also highly prized, because – unlike wheeled vehicles – it was exempt from tolls.

Until the late 19th century, a closed winter sled, or vozok, provided a high-speed means of transport through the snow-covered plains of European Russia and Siberia. It was a means of transport preferred by royals, bishops, and boyars of Muscovy. Several royal vozoks of historical importance have been preserved in the Kremlin Armoury.

Man-hauled sledges were the traditional means of transport on British exploring expeditions to the Arctic and Antarctic regions in the 19th and early 20th centuries, championed for example by Captain Scott.  Dog sleds were used by most others, such as Roald Amundsen.

Modern sleds

Transport

Some of these originally used draft animals but are now more likely to be pulled by an engine (snowmobile or tractor). Some use human power.
 The word "motor sled" is colloquial term for a snowmobile 
 The Inuit qamutiik is uniquely adapted for travel on the sea ice.
 The pulk (or ahkio) is a traditional sled of the Lapland region, used for expeditions, mountain rescue, and cold weather military units to haul equipment, supplies, and passengers.
 Rescue toboggan, developed from the pulk 
 Stone boat, a farm vehicle used for moving heavy objects such as stones or haybales; can be towed by a tractor.

Today some people use kites to tow exploration sleds.

Recreation

There are several types of recreational sleds designed for sliding down snowy hills (sledding):

 Toboggan, an elongated sled without runners, usually made from wood or plastic, but sometimes made from sheet metal.
 Saucer, a round sled curved like a saucer (see also flying saucer), also without runners and usually made out of plastic or metal
 Flexible Flyer, a steerable wooden sled with thin metal runners
 Kicksled or spark, a human-powered sled
 Inflatable sled or tube, a plastic membrane filled with air to make a very lightweight sled, like an inner tube
 Foam slider, a flat piece of durable foam with handles and a smooth underside
 Backcountry sled, a deep, steerable plastic sled to kneel on with pads and a seat belt
 Airboard, a snow bodyboard, i.e. an inflatable single-person sled

Competition

A few types of sleds are used only for a specific sport:

 Bobsled (British: bobsleigh), an aerodynamic composite-bodied vehicle on lightweight runners
 Luge and the skeleton, tiny one or two-person sleds with runners

Other
 A cutter is an open, lightweight, horse-drawn sleigh that usually holds no more than two people. It was developed in the United States around 1800. Historic styles were often quite decorative. About 1920, cutter racing began in the American Rocky Mountain west, first using a simple homemade chariot on skis, later replaced by a bicycle-wheeled chariot that was also pulled over snow.
Troika, a traditional Russian vehicle drawn by three horses, usually a sled, but it may also be a wheeled carriage.
 A sled or "stone boat", seen in truck and tractor pulling and horse pulling. A flat sled able to carry increasing amounts of weight to determine the maximum load the animal or machine can pull.

See also
 Snowboard
 Luge
 Travois, a frame used to drag loads over land, i.e. another horse-drawn transport method without wheels

References

External links

Animal-powered vehicles
Human-powered vehicles
Racing vehicles
Sledding
Sliding vehicles
Snow
Sports equipment